Rhodera is a monotypic genus of Balkan woodlouse hunting spiders containing the single species, Rhodera hypogea. It was first described by Christa L. Deeleman-Reinhold in 1989, and has only been found on Crete.

References

Dysderidae
Monotypic Araneomorphae genera